Jemera Rone (March 13, 1944 – July 29, 2015) was an American human rights activist. She served as the Human Rights Watch of East Africa Coordinator, and was best known for her years of human rights reporting on Sudan.

Biography
Rone was born in Fort Worth, Texas in 1944 and was raised in Venezuela. She graduated from Barnard College in 1966 and Rutgers University Law School. She was an outspoken critic of the development of the oil infrastructure in East Africa, which she believes often comes at the expense of the local population, rather than to their benefit.

She initiated Human Rights investigations, and has overseen investigations in El Salvador, Honduras, and Nicaragua, and been involved with monitoring human rights in 24 different countries. Rone lived in El Salvador in 1985 during their civil war. She reported on the human rights violations committed by the revolutionaries - the Sandinistas - to provide more factual evidence than the U.S. State Department was providing; they were backing the corrupt Salvadoran government. The information provided by the Human Rights Watch showed that even with a powerful administration such as Reagan's, they will provide the truth.

Death
Rone died on July 29, 2015, in Washington, D.C. from ovarian cancer at the age of 71.

References

Sources
Sudan: Oil Companies Complicit in Rights Abuses Human Rights News November 23, 2003
Sudan Government and Rebels Guilty of Deaths in Custody April 21, 1999

1944 births
2015 deaths
Deaths from ovarian cancer
Deaths from cancer in Washington, D.C.
American human rights activists
Women human rights activists
Barnard College alumni
People from Fort Worth, Texas